The State Emergency Service (SES) is the name used by a number of organisations in Australia that provide assistance during and after major incidents. Specifically, the service deals with floods, storms and tsunamis, but can also assist in other emergencies, such as vertical rescue and road crash rescues, missing persons searches, and medical evacuations. In other scenarios the SES may provide a support role to other agencies, particularly police and fire. The SES is operational 24 hours a day. The SES is constituted as separate organisations operating in the various Australian states and territories. Eight of the SES organisations co-ordinate through the Australian Council of State and Territory Emergency Services (ACSES).

History 
During World War II the National Emergency Service was created on 1 February 1939 to provide air raid wardens. The organisation was disbanded six months after the end of the war.

The Civil Defence Service began in Australia in 1955. It was formed as a precaution to any potential attacks on Australian soil. The name was changed to the "State Emergency Service" (abbreviated to "SES") during the 1970s, to reflect a change of emphasis into providing emergency help related to floods, storms and other natural emergencies. Every state and territory in Australia has its own State (or Territory) Emergency Service, and there are 43,000 volunteers spread across the country. Each state or territory is broken into regions, then units, and finally groups or teams.

The SES is one of many public safety organisations using AIIMS (Australasian Inter-Service Incident Management System). Typically, small incidents (AIIMS type 1) are assigned to a 'unit' and dealt with by a 'team'. AIIMS type 2 or 3 incidents are coordinated at the regional level.

Agency Executives 
Each State Emergency Service has an Executive appointed by the Minister responsible for each state.

Functions
The SES provides assistance to local communities in times of need. Because every community is different, every SES Unit has a slightly different set of roles and activities. Depending on the needs of the local community, a Unit may perform only some or all of these roles:

Funding
In addition to funds provided through legislation to the SES by state and local governments, SES groups also supplement their financial resources with donations made by individuals and businesses, and through other government grants. These donations typically contribute to purchasing or maintaining group equipment, such as vehicles and tools, or to improvement of SES property and facilities.

See also
 Australian Capital Territory State Emergency Service
 New South Wales State Emergency Service
 Queensland State Emergency Service
 Victoria State Emergency Service
South Australian State Emergency Service
 Community Emergency Response Team
 Civil defence

References

External links
 Australian Council of State Emergency Services
 Australian Capital Territory State Emergency Service
 New South Wales State Emergency Service
 Northern Territory Emergency Service
 Queensland State Emergency Service
 South Australia State Emergency Service
 Tasmania State Emergency Service
 Victoria State Emergency Service
 Western Australia State Emergency Service

Emergency services in Australia
Emergency organizations